The Lori are a nomadic community found in the Balochistan region of Iran and Pakistan. They must not be confused with the Lurs, who are an entirely distinct people also living in Iran.

Present circumstances 

Traditionally, the Lori were the carpenters and the blacksmiths of the Baloch country. Each occupational group is distinguished by a special appellation. For example, the carpenter is known as a dar trash Lori and the blacksmith is known as asinkar Lori. While those groups involved in entertainment are known as dohli, or drummers, and are a strictly endogamous group. The dholi are also involved in jugglery, palmistry, and fortune telling. Historically, they were also the sellers of donkeys, but this occupation has declined with the growth in modern transportation. 

In the Kachhi region  of Balochistan, the Lori live among both the Jamot and the Baloch and Brahui. Their traditional occupation was blacksmithing with many of the women employed as midwives. Most Lori of Kacchi also speak Seraiki, in addition to Balochi.

References 

Dom in Asia
Dom people
Social groups of Pakistan
Ethnic groups in Iran
Baloch tribes
Romani in Iran
Romani in Pakistan
Social groups of Balochistan, Pakistan